Island View may refer to:

Places 
 Island View, Nova Scotia, Canada
 Island View, Saskatchewan, Canada
 Island View, Minnesota, United States

Other uses 
 Island View Casino, in Gulfport, Mississippi, United States
 Island View High School, in Eastern Passage, Nova Scotia, Canada
 Island View Residential Treatment Center, in Syracuse, Utah, United States

See also 
 View Island